Peruvian Union University is a Seventh-day Adventist university in Lima, Peru. It is the second largest of ten Adventist universities in South America.  Its acronym is "UPeU". It is a part of the Seventh-day Adventist education system, the world's second largest Christian school system.
Founded in 1919 as part of the Industrial College (today the Miraflores Adventist College) in Miraflores, Lima, it was the first higher education facility started by Seventh-day Adventists in Peru.

Campus
The main campus of Peruvian Union University is at km 19.5, Carretera Central, Ñaña, Lima, Peru. There are also campuses at Tarapoto and Juliaca.

Academic areas
The university is made up of five schools/colleges, offering a number of undergraduate and graduate degrees.

Faculty of Business
 Business Administration and International Businesses
 Marketing and International Business
 Accounting and Finances
 Business Informatics
 Accounting and Tax Management
 Management Assistance
 Bilingual Management Assistance
 Ecotourism

Faculty of Health Sciences
 Nursing
 Medicine
 Nutrition
 Psychology

Faculty of Human Sciences and Education
 Communication Sciences
 Initial Education and Childcare
 Primary Education
 Math Education and Informatics
 Musical Education and Arts
 Linguistic Education and English

Faculty of Engineering and Architecture
 Architecture
 Environmental Engineering
 Food Engineering
 Systems Engineering

Faculty of Theology
 Theology

Study abroad opportunities
Andrews University co-sponsors Adventist Colleges Abroad, a program in which qualified students study overseas while completing requirements for graduation at Andrews. This language and cultural immersion is available in nine locations: Argentina, Austria, Brazil, France, Greece, Italy, Singapore, Spain, and Taiwan. Undergraduate students may also study abroad in the Andrews University Year in England at Newbold College. Affiliation and Extension Programs are offered in Chile, Peru, Trinidad and Tobago, Kenya, Nigeria, England, Italy, Romania, Russia, Lebanon, Hong Kong, and South Korea.

See also

 List of Seventh-day Adventist colleges and universities
 Seventh-day Adventist education

References

External links
 https://web.archive.org/web/20120526142120/http://www.upeu.edu.pe/go/upeu/facebook
Official website 

Universities and colleges affiliated with the Seventh-day Adventist Church
Universities in Peru
Educational institutions established in 1919
1919 establishments in Peru